This is a list of the suburbs of Port Moresby, the capital city of Papua New Guinea.

 Badili
 Baruni
 Bomana
 Boroko
 Ela Beach
 Ensisi Valley
 Erima
 Gabi
 Gabutu
 Gerehu
 Gordon
 Gordon North
 Hanuabada
 Hohola
 Hohola North
 Jacksons International Airport
 Kaevaga
 Kaugere
 Kila Kila
 Koki
 Konedobu
 Korobosea
 Matirogo
 Moitaka
 Morata
 Newtown
 Pari
 Sabama
 Saraga
 Tatana
 Taurama
 Tokarara
 Touaguba Hill
 Vabukori
 Waigani
 2 Mile
 3 Mile
 4 Mile
 6 Mile
 9 Mile

 
Port Moresby